Rachel Hunt Steenblik is an American author and poet. Her writings have focused on topics of faith, motherhood, and feminism, particularly in relation to her own Mormonism and the belief in a Heavenly Mother. Her poetry compilation, Mother's Milk, won the 2017 award for poetry from the Association for Mormon Letters.

Works 

 Mormon Feminism: Essential Writings (Co-Editor). Oxford, 2015. 
Mother's Milk: Poems in Search of Heavenly Mother (Author). By Common Consent Press, 2017. 
I Gave Her a Name (Author). By Common Consent Press, 2019.

See also 

 Latter-day Saint poetry
 Mormon feminism

References

External links 
 
 Articles at The Exponent

Latter Day Saint writers
Latter Day Saint poets
American writers
American feminist writers
American Latter Day Saint writers
Mormon feminists
Brigham Young University alumni
Simmons University alumni
Year of birth missing (living people)
Living people